Roman Stepankov is a Ukrainian footballer who plays as center forward. He was born on 1 January 1989 in Snyatyn, Ukraine.

Soccer career

 2006–2007 played for the team FSC Bukovyna Chernivtsi.
 2007–2009 played for FC Obolon Kyiv
 2009–2009 played for Goverla.
 2009–2010 played for Arsenal BT.
 2010–2012 returned to FSC Bukovyna Chernivtsi.
 2012–2013 played for Arsenal BT.
 2013–2014 played for FC Zirka Kirovohrad
 2014–2015 played for FSC Bukovyna Chernivtsi. He scored two goals.
 2015–2016 played for Puszcza Niepolomice. He has scored two goals.

In his entire career, he has made a total of four goals. He has earned no red cards or yellow cards.

References

 "Roman Stepankov." Footballdatabase.eu. N.p., n.d. Web. 19 Feb 2016. http://www.footballdatabase.eu/football.joueurs.roman.stepankov.187408.en.html

External links
Profile at FFU.org.ua

Ukrainian footballers
1989 births
Living people
Association football forwards
FC Bukovyna Chernivtsi players
FC Zirka Kropyvnytskyi players